"Anarchy in the U.K." is a song by English punk rock band the Sex Pistols. It was released as the band's debut single on 26 November 1976 and was later featured on their album Never Mind the Bollocks, Here's the Sex Pistols. "Anarchy in the U.K." was number 56 on Rolling Stone magazine's list of the 500 Greatest Songs of All Time and is included in the Rock and Roll Hall of Fame's 500 Songs that Shaped Rock and Roll.

Releases
Originally issued in a plain black sleeve, the single was the only Sex Pistols recording released by EMI, and reached number 38 on the UK Singles Chart before EMI dropped the group on 6 January 1977, a month after members of the band used profanity during a live television broadcast. (Although the EMI version was recorded on 17 October 1976, an earlier demo version was recorded between 10 and 12 October at Lansdowne/Wessex Studios, London. This version later surfaced on the Sex Pistols bootleg album Spunk).

In 2007, the surviving members (not including original Pistols bassist Glen Matlock) re-recorded "Anarchy in the U.K." for the video game Guitar Hero III: Legends of Rock because the multi-track master could not be found (it was rediscovered along with the rest of the Never Mind The Bollocks masters during a move in January 2012). The Guitar Hero version also appears in the film adaption of the A-Team. The song was also featured in the video game Tony Hawk's Pro Skater 4 as part of the soundtrack. The song also appears in the Constantine TV series during the episode "The Devil's Vinyl".

A limited edition 7" picture disc of the single was released on 21 April 2012 for that year's Record Store Day. In June 2022, a test pressing of the single that belonged to John Peel sold for more than £20,000 at auction.

Lyrics

In the documentary The Filth and the Fury, John Lydon described the composition of the song's opening lyrics, explaining that the best rhyme he could devise for the first line, "I am an Antichrist", was the second line, "I am an anarchiste". (Lydon confirmed that he is not an anarchist in a 2012 interview.)

Sex Pistols manager Malcolm McLaren considered the song "a call to arms to the kids who believe that rock and roll was taken away from them. It's a statement of self rule, of ultimate independence."

Abbreviations
The abbreviations used in the lyrics are a selection of civil war references from 1970s headlines, a suggestion of what could happen in the United Kingdom. The IRA and the UDA were the largest paramilitary armies in the conflict in Northern Ireland: the heavily armed IRA (Irish Republican Army) were on the Republican (anti-British, pro-unification) side, while the thousands-strong UDA (Ulster Defence Association) were on the Loyalist (pro-British, anti-unification) side. The MPLA (Movimento Popular de Libertação de Angola, or the People's Movement for the Liberation of Angola) were the political party that took control of Angola, formerly one of Portugal's African colonies, in a 1975–76 civil war, and still run the country today.  When Rotten sings, "I use the enemy", it's a deliberate homonym for "I use the NME", or New Musical Express, the British weekly music newspaper.

Track listing
"Anarchy in the UK"  – 3:31
"I Wanna Be Me"  – 3:12

Charts

Certifications

Personnel
 Johnny Rotten – lead vocals
 Steve Jones – guitar, backing vocals
 Glen Matlock – bass, backing vocals
 Paul Cook – drums

Cover versions

"L'Anarchie Pour Le UK" 
An alternative recording of the song in  time, accompanied by violin and accordion, apparently both translated into French and sung by a mysterious figure called Louis Brennon (also named as Jerzimy in some sources), appeared on the Sex Pistols' 1979 album The Great Rock 'n' Roll Swindle.

Megadeth 

"Anarchy in the U.K." was covered by American heavy metal band Megadeth for their third album So Far, So Good... So What!, released in 1988.

Megadeth's version has altered lyrics. Dave Mustaine explained that he could not understand Johnny Rotten's singing, so he made up the parts he could not understand (in a notable example, the line "another council tenancy" is changed to "and other cunt-like tendencies"). In addition, the country is changed to "USA", though the title is kept unchanged. The song's music video is a montage of live footage of the band, cartoon political figures, various scenes of violence, and of a man being forced to watch (much like Alex's therapy in A Clockwork Orange). Steve Jones played the second solo.

Mustaine now refuses to play the song live due to lyrics referring to the Anti-Christ, and he believes he's "better for it".

Track listing versions 
United States 7"
"Anarchy in the U.K."
"Liar"

United Kingdom 12"
"Anarchy in the U.K."
"Liar"
"502"

Germany 12"
"Anarchy in the U.K."
"Good Mourning/Black Friday" (live)
"Devil's Island" (live)

Charts

Green Jellÿ

Green Jellÿ's version of "Anarchy in the U.K." is a parody cover of the original with added Flintstones references. The song originally appeared as "Anarchy in Bedrock" on Green Jellÿ's (then Green Jellö's) Triple Live Möther Gööse at Budokan album. William Hanna and Joseph Barbera took offence to this version and to Green Jellÿ mocking The Flintstones but later relented, as this version was featured on the soundtrack to the Flintstones film that was released in 1994.

Critical reception
Pete Stanton from Smash Hits gave the Green Jellÿ version five out of five, writing, "They've followed the insanity of Three Little Pigs with more madness, littering a great song wit "Yabadabadoo"s and an eardrum bursting "Wiiillmmaaaa" at the end. Get into Green Jelly quick before a doctor slips them into strait-jackets, shoves them into a room and locks the door."

Track listing
 "Anarchy in the U.K." – 3:29
 "Green Jellÿ Theme Song" – 2:15
 "Three Little Pigs (Blowin Down the House Mix)" – 6:34

Personnel
 Danny Carey – Drums
 Bill Tutton, Rootin' Bloomquist – bass
 Marc Levinthal, Steven Shenar, Bernie Peaks – guitar
 Bill Manspeaker, Joe Cannizzaro, Gary Helsinger, Greg Raynard, and Maynard James Keenan – vocals
 Kim O'Donnell and Caroline Jester – backup vocals, floor tom drums

Mötley Crüe

American heavy metal band Mötley Crüe covered the song on their 1991 compilation album Decade of Decadence, substituting US analogies and organizations in the lyrics for UK ones. It was also their last song with lead singer Vince Neil until 1997's Generation Swine.

References

External links
 SexPistolsOfficial.com: 'Anarchy in the UK 7"'
 Classic Tracks: 'Anarchy in the UK'

1976 debut singles
1988 singles
1991 singles
1993 singles
Sex Pistols songs
1976 songs
Protest songs
Megadeth songs
Mötley Crüe songs
Green Jellÿ songs
Songs written by John Lydon
Songs written by Steve Jones (musician)
Songs written by Glen Matlock
Songs written by Paul Cook
Song recordings produced by Chris Thomas (record producer)
Songs about the United Kingdom
Anarchist songs
EMI Records singles
Capitol Records singles
Zoo Entertainment (record label) singles
Elektra Records singles